"Back to School Mr. Bean" is the eleventh episode of the British television series Mr. Bean, produced by Tiger Aspect Productions and Thames Television for Central Independent Television. It was first broadcast on ITV on Wednesday, 26 October 1994 and was watched by 14,450,000 viewers during its original broadcast.

Plot

Act 1: At School 
Mr. Bean attends an open day at a local school. While looking for a place to park his Mini, he spots a near-identical Mini in a reserved parking space and replaces it with his own. Two Army Cadets help Bean to push the other Mini away, thinking it has broken down. He then confuses a troop of cadets by giving them commands which cause them to stand in unusual stances; the commander scolds the troop upon his return. Inside the school, Bean looks at various things on a wall, tampers with a philatelist's stamp collection and disturbs a calligrapher. He then sees a woman using a Van de Graaff generator to make her hair stand on end and tries it for himself, but it doesn't work for him. It leaves his body electrostatically charged, such that when he then picks up a leaflet, it gets stuck to his hand. When he gives the leaflet to another woman, her skirt rises up, revealing her underwear, prompting Bean to exit.

Act 2: Laboratory Trouble and the Art Class 
In the chemistry lab, Bean experiments with several chemicals and creates an unstable chemical reaction. As Bean exits the room, a young boy walks in and a violent explosion occurs that creates an abundance of blue smoke. Bean then joins a still-life art class and starts drawing a bowl of fruit,  but the bowl is soon replaced with a nude model. When Bean realizes this, he is reluctant to draw any further, despite the teacher's attempts to sway him, so he goes over to the potter's wheel and starts making clay pots. A teacher enters with the boy from the chemistry lab (now coated in blue powder), looking for the instigator of the explosion; she rushes the boy out after they notice the nude model. Bean places the finished pots on the model's breasts, allowing him to draw her without embarrassment.

Act 3: The Judo Class and the Toilet 
While partaking in a judo class, Bean is reluctant to allow himself to be thrown. He ultimately manages to overtake the instructor by pushing him to the ground from behind and rolling him up in a mat. Upon changing back into his regular clothes, Bean finds that he is wearing someone else's trousers and searches for his own. He soon finds a man in the men's toilets wearing them. Bean grabs the man by the legs and pulls the trousers off. He throws the man's underpants back to the man, though they end up landing in the toilet.

Act 4: The Disaster 
Just as Bean exits the school, there is an announcement over the PA system stating that there will be a demonstration shortly. Bean sees his Mini in the middle of the car park, but stops to buy a cupcake from a nearby cake stall. As he eats the cupcake, a giant Chieftain tank approaches and crushes his Mini. After the tank leaves, Bean does a double take, drops his cupcake, turns around, and slowly approaches his Mini with a tearful look on his face. As the closing credits roll, Bean examines the wreckage of the Mini and finds that the padlock he used to lock it is unharmed. Satisfied, he pulls the lock off and walks away.

Continuity 
During The Best Bits of Mr. Bean, Bean finds the wreckage of his destroyed Mini in his loft.

Although the Mini has been crushed it reappears two episodes later in "Goodnight, Mr Bean". This Mini was also Austin Citron Green with a matte black bonnet also with the registration number SLW 287R. It is possible that this Mini was the one (registration ACW 497V) that was supposed to have been crushed in the episode and that Bean took it in as his own after his was destroyed by the Army Tank.

Cast 
Rowan Atkinson as Mr. Bean
Suzanne Bertish as the art teacher
Cindy Milo as the nude model in the art class
Sam Driscoll as the boy chemistry lab
Christopher Ryan as judo student
Lucy Fleming as the angry teacher with the boy
David Schneider as the judo instructor
Harriet Eastcott as the electrocuted woman
Christopher Driscoll as the man in school corridor
John Clegg as the calligrapher 
John Barrard as the stamp collector
Al Ashton as ACF Drill Instructor
Robin Driscoll as Man in School (uncredited)

Production 
There were three cars crushed during filming. Two cars were specifically built for filming this episode and were painted with the same colour scheme as the main car; but with the engines removed. One of these two Minis was also used for the part where Mr. Bean substitutes his car with the identical car (registration ACW 497V). One of the three main cars with the engine removed was also crushed by the tank.

References

External links 
 

Mr. Bean episodes
1994 British television episodes
Television shows written by Rowan Atkinson
Television shows written by Robin Driscoll